Joshua Dylan Meyers (born January 8, 1976) is an American actor and comedian, known for being a cast member of the sketch comedy series MADtv and playing Randy Pearson in the eighth and final season of That '70s Show. He is the younger brother of former SNL cast member and Late Night host Seth Meyers.

Early life and education
Meyers was born in Bedford, New Hampshire, on January 8, 1976, the younger of two boys born of Hilary Claire Meyers (née Olson), a French teacher, and Laurence Meyers Jr., who worked in finance.

He attended Manchester High School West in Manchester, New Hampshire. He went on to graduate from Northwestern University in Evanston, Illinois. Meyers' paternal grandfather was Ashkenazi Jewish, and his other ancestry is Czech–Austrian and Croatian (from his paternal grandmother), Swedish, English, and German.

Career

MADtv
Meyers officially joined the cast of MADtv in 2002, as a featured performer for the eighth season. He would fill in the spot of the Spishak Spokesperson that David Herman and Pat Kilbane previously owned. Meyers was also known for his celebrity impersonations, including Anna Nicole Smith's son, Daniel, various members of 'N Sync (particularly Justin Timberlake), rapper Eminem, and actor Owen Wilson.

Meyers's appearances on MADtv on Fox aired directly opposite his brother Seth's appearances on Saturday Night Live on NBC, making Josh Meyers the only MADtv cast member to have a family member (blood-related or otherwise) be a cast member on Saturday Night Live. This was referenced on a season 28 episode of Saturday Night Live in which Seth appears on Weekend Update to talk to his father and tells him to turn off MADtv and pay attention to him.

Other work
When Topher Grace left That '70s Show at the end of the show's seventh season, Meyers was chosen as a replacement, starring as Randy Pearson during the eighth and final season. In 2006, Meyers made an appearance in the feature film Date Movie, where he plays Napoleon Dynamite and Owen Wilson's character from Wedding Crashers.

Filmography

References

External links
 

1976 births
21st-century American male actors
American impressionists (entertainers)
American male comedians
21st-century American comedians
American male film actors
American male television actors
American people of Austrian descent
American people of Czech descent
American people of English descent
American people of German descent
American people of Jewish descent
American people of Swedish descent
Living people
Male actors from Evanston, Illinois
Male actors from New Hampshire
Northwestern University alumni
People from Bedford, New Hampshire
Actors from Manchester, New Hampshire
American sketch comedians